Féodor Atkine is a French actor of Russian-Polish origin, born on 27 February 1948 in Paris.

A screen performer, he has participated in numerous plays, films and television series in France and abroad.

Life and career
Féodor Atkine was born to a Russian father from Harbin, capital of Manchuria, in northeast China, whose family had fled the pogroms in Poland and Ukraine to take refuge in the Far East the day before of the Russo-Japanese War.

He has the distinction of participating in many productions where he speaks in French, English and/or Spanish; he has been involved in films by Woody Allen, Claude Zidi, Raoul Ruiz, Claude Lelouch, Pedro Almodóvar, Éric Rohmer, etc.

He has participated in several plays as well as radio productions.

Atkine is also known for dubbing in American films or television series but also for characters in Disney productions. He is (among others) the regular French voice of William Hurt, Ben Kingsley, Hugo Weaving and Hugh Laurie (which he notably dubs in the French version of House) as well as one of the recurring voices of Jonathan Banks, Frank Langella and Jeremy Irons. Since 2012, he also doubles Tommy Lee Jones, following Claude Giraud's retirement and subsequent death.

Atkine was awarded the Ordre des Arts et des Lettres in 2019.

Selected filmography

References

External links

 

1948 births
Living people
Male actors from Paris
French male film actors
French male stage actors
French people of Russian descent
French people of Polish descent
20th-century French male actors
21st-century French male actors
French male television actors
French male voice actors
Officiers of the Ordre des Arts et des Lettres